Seven Mortal Sins is a Japanese anime television series produced by Artland and TNK that aired from April 14 to July 29, 2017. The series ran for 12 episodes and had 19 ona. It is an adaptation of Hobby Japan's media franchise The 7 Deadly Sins (七つの大罪 Nanatsu no Taizai), which primarily consists of a series of fantasy figures. The opening theme "My Sweet Maiden" and ending theme "Welcome to our diabolic paradise" were both sung by Mia Regina.

The Seven Heavenly Virtues is a Japanese anime television series produced by Bridge that aired from January 26 to March 30, 2018. The series ran for 10 episodes and had 2 ova. It is an adaptation of Hobby Japan's media franchise The Seven Heavenly Virtues (七つの美徳 Nanatsu no Bitoku), which primarily consists of a series of fantasy figures. The opening theme is "Psychomachia" by Yousei Teikoku.

Episode list

The Seven Mortal Sins

The Seven Heavenly Virtues

Notes

References

Seven Mortal Sins